Petru Vlah (born July 13, 1970) is a politician from Moldova. He has been a member of the Parliament of Moldova since 2010.

References

External links 
 Parlamentul Republicii Moldova

1970 births
Living people
Liberal Democratic Party of Moldova MPs
Moldovan MPs 2010–2014
People from Comrat